Catocala fugitiva is a moth in the family Erebidae first described by Warren in 1914. It is found in Kazakhstan.

References

fugitiva
Moths described in 1914
Moths of Asia